The 2019 ISSF World Cup is the annual edition of the ISSF World Cup in the Olympic shooting events, governed by the International Shooting Sport Federation.

The World Cup series also acted as the qualification tournaments for the 2020 Olympic Games.
India emerged as the most successful nation in the series, topping medal table in all Rifle-Pistol World Cups and Finals.

Men's results

Rifle events

Pistol events

Shotgun event

Women's results

Rifle events

Pistol events

Shotgun events

Mixed team results 

(BMM- Bronze-medal match)

Overall Medal Table 
Updated till 2019 ISSF World Cup Putian (22/11/2019) 03:00 PM

References 

ISSF World Cup
ISSF World Cup